The 1942 Kansas gubernatorial election was held on November 3, 1942. Republican nominee Andrew Frank Schoeppel defeated Democratic nominee William H. Burke with 56.68% of the vote.

Primary elections
Primary elections were held on August 4, 1942.

Democratic primary

Candidates 
William H. Burke, businessman
Paul B. Green

Results

Republican primary

Candidates
Andrew Frank Schoeppel, Chairman of the Kansas Corporation Commission
Carl E. Friend, incumbent Lieutenant Governor
Clyde M. Reed, United States Senator
Thale P. Skovgard

Results

General election

Candidates
Major party candidates 
Andrew Frank Schoeppel, Republican
William H. Burke, Democratic

Other candidates
David C. White, Prohibition
Ida A. Beloof, Socialist

Results

References

1942
Kansas
Gubernatorial